A megaphone, speaking-trumpet, bullhorn, blowhorn, or loudhailer is usually a portable or hand-held, cone-shaped acoustic horn used to amplify a person's voice or other sounds and direct it in a given direction.  The sound is introduced into the narrow end of the megaphone, by holding it up to the face and speaking into it, and the sound waves radiate out the wide end.  A megaphone increases the volume of sound by increasing the acoustic impedance seen by the vocal cords, matching the impedance of the vocal cords to the air, so that more sound power is radiated.  It also serves to direct the sound waves in the direction the horn is pointing.  It somewhat distorts the sound of the voice because the frequency response of the megaphone is greater at higher sound frequencies.

Since the 1960s the voice-powered acoustic megaphone described above has been replaced by the electric megaphone, which uses a microphone, an electrically-powered amplifier and a folded horn loudspeaker to amplify the voice.

History

The initial inventor of the speaking trumpet is a subject of historical controversy. There have been references to speakers in Ancient Greece (5th Century B.C.) wearing masks with cones protruding from the mouth in order to amplify their voices in theatres. Hellenic architects may have also consciously utilized acoustic physics in their design of theatre amphitheaters.

A drawing by Louis Nicolas (right) on page 14 of the Codex canadensis, circa 1675 to 1682, shows a Native American chief named Iscouakité using a megaphone made of birch bark. The text of the illustration says that he is addressing his soldiers through a birch bark tube.

Both Samuel Morland and Athanasius Kircher have been credited with inventing megaphones around the same time in the 17th century. Morland, in a work published in 1655, wrote about his experimentation with different horns.  His largest megaphone consisted of over 20 feet of copper tube and could reportedly project a person's voice a mile and a half.

Twenty years earlier, Kircher described a device that could be used as both a megaphone and for "overhearing" people speaking outside a house.  His coiled horn would be mounted into the side of a building, with a narrow end inside that could be either spoken into or listened to, and the wide mouth projecting through the outside wall.

Morland favored a straight, tube-shaped speaking device. Kircher's horn, on the other hand, utilized a "cochleate" design, where the horn was twisted and coiled to make it more compact.

A later, papier-mâché trumpet of special design was the Sengerphone.

Additionally, in ruins of Tiwanaku are stones around the central place with holes shaped in a megaphone's profile. Their purpose is today unknown, but as local guards can show, it is possible to amplify a human voice loud enough to hear it across a large area.

The term 'megaphone' was first associated with Thomas Edison's instrument 200 years later. In 1878, Edison developed a device similar to the speaking trumpet in hopes of benefiting the deaf and hard of hearing. His variation included three separate funnels lined up in a row. The two outer funnels, which were six feet and eight inches long, were made of paper and connected to a tube inserted in each ear. The middle funnel was similar to Morland's speaking trumpet, but had a larger slot to insert a user's mouth.

With Edison's megaphone, a low whisper could be heard a thousand feet away, while a normal tone of voice could be heard roughly two miles away. On the listening end, the receiver could hear a low whisper at a thousand feet away.  However the apparatus was much too large to be portable, limiting its use.  George Prescott wrote: "The principal drawback at present is the large size of the apparatus."

Prior to the invention of the electric microphone, early pop singers sang with a megaphone.

Since the 1960s, acoustic megaphones have generally been replaced by electric versions (below), although the cheap, light, rugged acoustic megaphone is still used in a few venues, like cheering at sporting events and cheerleading, and by lifeguards at pools and beaches where the moisture could damage the electronics of electric megaphones.

Electric megaphone

An electric megaphone is a handheld public address system, an electronic device that amplifies the human voice like an acoustic megaphone, using electric power.  It consists of a microphone to convert sound waves into an electrical audio signal, an amplifier powered by a battery to increase the power of the audio signal, and a loudspeaker to convert the audio signal to sound waves again.   Although slightly heavier than acoustic megaphones, electric megaphones can amplify the voice to a higher level, to over 90 dB.  They have replaced acoustic megaphones in most applications, and are generally used to address congregations of people wherever stationary public address systems are not available; at outdoor sporting events, movie sets, political rallies, and street demonstrations.

Although electronic public address systems have existed since vacuum tube amplifiers were developed in the early 1920s, vacuum tube versions were too heavy to be portable.  Practical portable electric megaphones had to await the development of microelectronics which followed the invention of the transistor in 1947.  In 1954, TOA Corporation developed the EM-202, the world's first transistorized megaphone.

Handheld versions are shaped generally like the old acoustic megaphone, with a microphone at one end and a horn speaker at the other, and a pistol grip on the side, with a trigger switch to turn it on.  In use, the device is held up to the mouth, and the trigger is pressed to turn it on while speaking.  Other larger versions hang from the shoulder on a strap, and have a separate handheld microphone on a cord to speak into, so users can address a crowd without the instrument obscuring their faces.   A vast array of modern electric megaphones are available to purchase, and characteristics like power, weight, price, and the presence of alarms and shoulder straps all contribute to a consumer's choice.

The shape of the megaphone directly affects the range of projection; narrower horns compensate for lower power by concentrating sound more sharply than wide horns.

Impact on society 

Portable megaphones are widely used for crowd management and mass communication. When needing to communicate information or directions to a large crowd of people in one place, an electric megaphone is valuable when other public address systems are not present.

Besides their practical implications, public address systems, including megaphones, also had a social impact.  Public address systems helped promote women's participation in society. In events like the National Republican and Democratic Conventions of 1920, when electronic public address systems were first becoming popularized, women used these amplifying technologies during roll call of participants.  Later, portable electric megaphones extended this equalizing influence to outdoor events. Some protest leaders use electric megaphones to speak to an outdoor crowd or to other protesters.

As of the 2010s, cheerleading is one of the few fields that still uses acoustic megaphones. Cheerleaders at the University of Minnesota are credited with first using acoustic megaphones in routines in 1898. Since then, cheerleaders have relied heavily on acoustic megaphones during performances at sporting events. Generally, female cheerleaders would use pom poms while male cheerleaders, with loud booming voices, would project cheers through megaphones. Vocal projection is an important aspect for cheerleading, so experts recommend the use of acoustic megaphones not only to increase the volume of sound, but also to protect performers’ voices in the process.

For decades, film directors have used megaphones to communicate with their cast and crew on sets where it was hard to hear.  The acoustic megaphone became an iconic clichéd symbol of a movie director, although modern directors use electric megaphones.  A major contributor to this cliche was Cecil B. DeMille, director of epic movies like The Ten Commandments and The King of Kings. Many of his films were biblical epics set on vast outdoor sets that required communication with hundreds of extras.  
 
The distinctive distorted sound of a human voice amplified by a megaphone is widely recognized, from its use in train and bus stations and sports arenas.  Applied to music, it gives the sound of an antique acoustic gramophone record player.   It has been used in radio advertisements and popular music to give retro and often humorous effects.  A recorded voice or music can be processed to give it a  "megaphone" sound effect without using an actual megaphone, by audio recording decks and software.   In recording software like Logic Pro and Pro Tools, selecting certain filters and settings will produce an artificial sound almost indistinguishable from an electric megaphone.

Legal restrictions

Governments can pass laws restricting the use of electronically amplified megaphones. In the US the ability to use a megaphone in public can be restricted to certain decibel levels, time of day or banned in residential neighborhoods. However, under the First Amendment, the specific kinds of speech used with a megaphone cannot be restricted.

See also
 Long range acoustic device (LRAD)
 Water Talkie
 Human microphone

References

External links

 "Controlling Public Protest: First Amendment Implications" An article about restrictions that may legally be imposed on public protests (including use of bullhorns), by Daniel L. Schofield, S.J.D., published in the November 1994 issue of the FBI's Law Enforcement Bulletin.

Audio amplifiers